|}

The Blandford Stakes is a Group 2 flat horse race in Ireland open to thoroughbred fillies and mares aged three years or older. It is run at the Curragh over a distance of 1 mile and 2 furlongs (2,012 metres), and it is scheduled to take place each year in September.

History
The event is named after Blandford, a successful sire in the 1930s. It was formerly open to horses of either gender, and used to be contested over 1 mile and 4 furlongs.

The race was held in mid-October during the late 1980s and early 1990s. Its distance was shortened by a furlong in 1994. It was relegated from Group 2 to Group 3 level in 1999, and from this point it took place in mid-September.

The Blandford Stakes was cut to its present length and restricted to fillies and mares in 2001. It regained Group 2 status in 2004. It is currently part of the Irish Champions Weekend meeting.

Records
Most successful horse since 1947 (2 wins):
 Nemain – 1985, 1986
 Red Bloom – 2005, 2006
 Shamreen - 2016, 2017

Leading jockey since 1950 (5 wins):
 Liam Ward – Beau Sire (1950), Do Well (1951), Jongleur (1956), Wenona (1968), Riboprince (1970)
 Michael Kinane – Humbel (1995), Insatiable (1999), Chiang Mai (2000), Four Sins (2007), Katiyra (2008)
 Pat Smullen - Irrestible Jewel (2002), Chinese White (2009), Tarfasha (2014), Shamreen (2016, 2017)

Leading trainer since 1950 (15 wins):
 Vincent O'Brien – Little Mo (1959), Silver Moon (1961), Donato (1965), Wenona (1968), Riboprince (1970), Wenceslas (1971), Manitoulin (1972), Richard Grenville (1974), King Pellinore (1975), Gonzales (1980),  (1981), Lords (1982), South Atlantic (1983), Kris Kringle (1988), Andros Bay (1992)

Winners since 1980

Earlier winners

 1947: Esprit de France
 1948: Wild Johnnie
 1949: Pink Larkspur
 1950: Beau Sire
 1951: Do Well
 1952: Thirteen of Diamonds
 1953: Ardent Lover
 1954: Northern Gleam
 1955: Nile Bird
 1956: Jongleur
 1957: Roistar
 1958: Royal Highway
 1959: Little Mo
 1960: Hunch
 1961: Silver Moon *
 1962: Sicilian Prince
 1963: Feemoss
 1964: Biscayne
 1965: Donato
 1966: Royal Display
 1967: Dominion Day
 1968: Wenona
 1969: Barrons Court
 1970: Riboprince
 1971: Wenceslas
 1972: Manitoulin
 1973: Miss Therese
 1974: Richard Grenville
 1975: King Pellinore
 1976: Northern Treasure
 1977: Panamint
 1978: Valley Forge
 1979: Bohemian Grove

* The 1961 winner Silver Moon was later renamed Silver Dollar.

See also
 Horse racing in Ireland
 List of Irish flat horse races

References
 Paris-Turf: 
 Racing Post:

 galopp-sieger.de – Blandford Stakes.
 horseracingintfed.com – International Federation of Horseracing Authorities – Blandford Stakes (2018).
 irishracinggreats.com – Blandford Stakes (Group 2).
 pedigreequery.com – Blandford Stakes – Curragh.

Flat races in Ireland
Curragh Racecourse
Middle distance horse races for fillies and mares